The 1998 ECAC Hockey Men's Ice Hockey Tournament was the 37th tournament in league history. It was played between March 13 and March 21, 1998. Quarterfinal games were played at home team campus sites, while the final five games were played at the Olympic Arena (subsequently renamed Herb Brooks Arena) in Lake Placid, New York. By winning the tournament, Princeton received the ECAC's automatic bid to the 1998 NCAA Division I Men's Ice Hockey Tournament.

Format
The tournament featured three rounds of play. The two teams that finish below tenth place in the standings are not eligible for tournament play. In the first round, the first and tenth seeds, the second and ninth seeds, the third seed and eighth seeds, the fourth seed and seventh seeds and the fifth seed and sixth seeds played a modified best-of-three series, where the first team to receive 3 points moves on, with the three highest-seeded winners advancing to the semifinals and the remaining two winners playing in the Four vs. Five matchup. After the opening round every series becomes a single-elimination game. In the semifinals, the highest seed plays the winner of the four vs. five game while the two remaining teams play with the winners advancing to the championship game and the losers advancing to the third place game. The tournament champion receives an automatic bid to the 1998 NCAA Division I Men's Ice Hockey Tournament.

Conference standings
Note: GP = Games played; W = Wins; L = Losses; T = Ties; PTS = Points; GF = Goals For; GA = Goals Against

Bracket
Teams are reseeded after the First Round

Note: * denotes overtime period(s)

First round

(1) Yale vs. (10) St. Lawrence

(2) Clarkson vs. (9) Vermont

(3) Rensselaer vs. (8) Cornell

(4) Brown vs. (7) Princeton

(5) Harvard vs. (6) Colgate

Four vs. Five

(7) Princeton vs. (8) Cornell

Semifinals

(1) Yale vs. (7) Princeton

(2) Clarkson vs. (5) Harvard

Third place

(1) Yale vs. (5) Harvard

Championship

(2) Clarkson vs. (7) Princeton

Tournament awards

All-Tournament Team
F Syl Apps III (Princeton)
F Jeff Halpern* (Princeton)
F Matt Reid (Clarkson)
D Willie Mitchell (Clarkson)
D Steve Shirreffs (Princeton)
G Erasmo Saltarelli (Princeton)
* Most Outstanding Player(s)

References

External links
ECAC Hockey
1997–98 ECAC Hockey Standings
1997–98 NCAA Standings

ECAC Hockey Men's Ice Hockey Tournament
ECAC tournament